Mia Hermansson (born 12 December 1992) is a Swedish former judoka. She competed at the 2016 Summer Olympics in the 63 kg division, and was eliminated in the first round by Edwige Gwend.

References

External links

 
 

1992 births
Living people
Swedish female judoka
Olympic judoka of Sweden
Judoka at the 2016 Summer Olympics
European Games competitors for Sweden
Judoka at the 2015 European Games
20th-century Swedish women
21st-century Swedish women